The WSA World Series (formerly known as the WISPA World Series) is a series of women's squash tournaments which are part of the Women's Squash Association (WSA) World Tour for the 2014 squash season. The eight best-performing players in the World Series events qualify for the annual WSA World Series Finals tournament.

Each year, several tournaments on the tour are designated World Series events. These include major events such as the World Championship, the US Open or the British Open. Then, early the next year, the eight best-performing players from the World Series events are invited to compete in the WSA World Series Finals (a similar event to the WTA Tour Championships).

A similar series on the men's tour is the PSA World Series.

Tournaments
Here is the list of tournaments that have been at least a season WSA World Series tournament :

WSA World Series Ranking Points
WSA World Series events also have a separate World Series ranking. Points for this are calculated on a cumulative basis after each World Series event.

In the same time, the players competing in WSA World Series Events earn world ranking points according to the prize money, classification of the event, and the final position in the draw the player reaches.

Past World Series Finals

See also
PSA World Series
Official Women's Squash World Ranking

References

External links 
 WSA World Series Standings website
 WSA Tour Rules

Squash tournaments